Macleaya cordata, the five-seeded plume-poppy,  is a species of flowering plant in the poppy family Papaveraceae, which is used ornamentally. It is native to China and Japan.

Etymology

The Latin cordata means "heart-shaped", referring to the leaves. The common name plume poppy is used for plants of the genus Macleaya.

The Chinese name 博落回 (bóluòhúi) is derived from 簸邏迴 (bòluóhúi), the Xianbei name for a musical instrument also known as 大角 (dà jiǎo, "big horn"), because the sound of blowing the dried hollow stem resembles the instrument sound.

The Japanese name 竹似草 (takenigusa) means "bamboo-like herb", also referring to its hollow stem.

Cultivation
It self-seeds readily and can be invasive, so in cultivation requires space. It is a popular subject for flower arranging. It has gained the Royal Horticultural Society's Award of Garden Merit. 

Macleaya × kewensis, bred at Kew Gardens, is a hybrid of M. cordata and M. microcarpa. The cultivar 'Flamingo' has pink tinged flowers, and has also received the Award of Garden Merit.

Other uses
Macleaya cordata is a source of a variety of chemical compounds, mainly isoquinoline alkaloids.  The seed oil contains dihydrosanguinarine, dihydrochelerythrine, and twelve fatty acids of which linoleic, oleic, palmitic and stearic acids predominate.

Footnotes

References

External links

 

Papaveroideae